Bengalization may refer to:

  Spread of the Bengali language, people and culture:
 Bengali Renaissance - a movement in Bengal region during the period of the British Indian Empire period
 Bengali nationalism - a form of nationalism that focuses on Bengalis as a singular nation
 Bengali language movement - a movement to recognize  Bengali as an official language in former East Pakistan
 Bangladeshi diaspora - people of Bangladeshi descent who have immigrated to or were born in another country
 Greater Bangladesh -  a conspiracy theory of a United Bengal
A cultural shift of whereby populations in North East Indian states adopted historical Bengali culture and languages.

See also
 Renamed places in Bangladesh
 Renaming of places in West Bengal